Ronald Jones (19 August 1934 – 30 December 2021) was a British track and field athlete.

Career
Jones represented Great Britain at two consecutive Summer Olympics, starting with the 1964 Tokyo Games. He was Britain’s team captain in the 1968 Mexico Games. He combined with Peter Radford, David Jones and Berwyn Jones to equal the world 4 x 110 yds world record in 1963 with 40.0 secs. Ron held the Welsh 100m record for 27 years until it was beaten by future world 110m hurdles record holder Colin Jackson with 10.29 in 1990.

After his illustrious athletics career he became either the CEO or MD of three major football clubs in the English leagues. He was also a member of both the Welsh Athletics Hall of Fame and the Welsh Sports Hall of Fame.

Bronze medal winner, Belgrade and Perth
He won the bronze medal in the men's 4x100 metres relay at the 1962 European Championships in Belgrade, Yugoslavia, alongside Alf Meakin, Berwyn Jones, and David Jones. He also won a bronze medal with David England, Nick Whitehead and Berwyn Jones in the 4 x 110 yards relay while competing for Wales at the 1962 British Empire and Commonwealth Games in Perth, Australia.

Personal life and death
Jones was born on 19 August 1934 in Aberdare, Rhondda Cynon Taf. He died in Cambridge on 30 December 2021, at the age of 87.

References

Sources
 British Olympic Committee
 Sports Reference

1934 births
2021 deaths
Athletes (track and field) at the 1958 British Empire and Commonwealth Games
Athletes (track and field) at the 1962 British Empire and Commonwealth Games
Athletes (track and field) at the 1966 British Empire and Commonwealth Games
Athletes (track and field) at the 1964 Summer Olympics
Athletes (track and field) at the 1968 Summer Olympics
Commonwealth Games bronze medallists for Wales
Commonwealth Games medallists in athletics
European Athletics Championships medalists
Olympic athletes of Great Britain
Sportspeople from Aberdare
Welsh male sprinters
Medallists at the 1962 British Empire and Commonwealth Games